Due to the outbreak of WW2, there was no 'official' senior football competition in Scotland, with the Scottish Football League and the Scottish Cup both suspended for the duration.  Therefore, the 1939–40 season was the first Scottish football season in which Dumbarton competed in the 'emergency' competitions which were arranged by the clubs themselves.

Scottish Second Division

Four games into the season, Britain was at war with Nazi Germany and all official Scottish football competition was suspended for its duration.

Scottish Western Division
In October 1939, in the absence of official competition, the clubs themselves wanted competitive football to continue in some form and arranged for two regional leagues of 16 teams each to be played, with Dumbarton playing in the Western Division – along with the likes of Celtic, Rangers etc. – teams they had not played since being relegated in 1922.  Most of the First Division players were already contracted to play for their league opponents and it was no surprise that in this first season of the 'wartime' league, Dumbarton finished bottom (16th out of 16) with 18 points – 30 behind champions Rangers.

Scottish War Emergency Cup
In place of the Scottish Cup, a Scottish War Emergency Cup was established, to be played for by all the teams competing in the regional leagues.  Dumbarton reached the second round before losing to Airdrie.

Dumbartonshire Cup
While the Dumbartonshire Cup competition had been discontinued some years earlier, during the weeks following the suspension of official competition and the start of the regional leagues, Dumbarton played Vale of Leven (a junior football side) for custody of the trophy, and the senior team duly won the day.

Stirlingshire Cup
Following the demise of the Dumbartonshire Association, Dumbarton had been accepted as members of the Stirlingshire Association, and took part for the first time in the Stirlingshire Cup.  Dumbarton were knocked out at the semi final stage by Falkirk, although the competition was never completed.

Friendly

Player statistics
Players registrations were effectively cancelled and wages fixed at £2 per week which meant that players were free to sign for clubs local to their war work as 'guest players'.

|}

Source:

Transfers

Players in

Players out 

In addition Walter Bulloch, William Cameron, John Craig, Andrew Cumming, Alistair MacKillop, James McAllister, Patrick McArdle, William Monaghan, John Smith and John Yuill all played their last games in Dumbarton 'colours'.

Source:

References

Dumbarton F.C. seasons
Scottish football clubs 1939–40 season